Route 276 is a 42 km two-lane east/west highway on the south shore of the Saint Lawrence River in the Chaudière-Appalaches region of Quebec, Canada. Its eastern terminus is close to Lac-Etchemin at the junction of Route 277, and the western terminus is at the junction of Route 112 in Saint-Frédéric.

Towns located along Route 276

 Saint-Frédéric
 Saint-Joseph-des-Érables
 Saint-Joseph-de-Beauce 
 Saint-Odilon-de-Cranbourne

See also
 List of Quebec provincial highways

References

External links 
 Official Transports Quebec Map 
 Route 276 on Google Maps

276